Robert Morris Earthwork is a 1979 public art earthworks installation in Seatac, Washington by Robert Morris. The area surrounding the piece, a former gravel pit overlooking the Kent Valley outside of Seattle, has rapidly filled in with urban growth, leading to efforts to both protect it and to enhance public access and enjoyment. The earthwork was the result of a King County government symposium titled Earthworks: Land Reclamation as Sculpture. The same symposium also gave impetus to the creation of Mill Creek Canyon Earthworks. According to the former director of public art for the city and county, the two pieces are the major earthworks in King County; according to 4Culture, the piece is of "international importance".  The site was listed on the National Register of Historic Places in 2021.

References

Sources

External links

 from Washington Trust for Historic Preservation
Photographs of construction and finished piece from Washington Trust for Historic Preservation

1979 establishments in Washington (state)
Buildings and structures completed in 1979
Land art
Public art in the United States
SeaTac, Washington
National Register of Historic Places in King County, Washington